Underworld is a 1996 neo-noir action comedy film directed by Roger Christian and starring Denis Leary, Joe Mantegna and Annabella Sciorra.

Plot
Just out of prison, Johnny Crown (Denis Leary) is running a bit late for a meeting he's been waiting seven years to attend. First he has a little unfinished business to take care of: hunt down every last man responsible for taking out his dad. Like everything else Johnny does, he's going to do it his way – in style. With his mysterious friend Frank Gavilan (Joe Mantegna) along for the ride, Johnny's out to uncover just who masterminded his father's hit, and settle the score for good, on one eventful Father's Day.

Cast
 Denis Leary as Johnny Alt / Johnny Crown
 Joe Mantegna as Frank Gavilan / Frank Cassady / Richard Essex 
 Annabella Sciorra as Dr. Leah 
 Larry Bishop as Ned Lynch 
 Abe Vigoda as Will Cassady 
 Robert Costanzo as Stan 
 Traci Lords as Anna 
 Jimmie F. Skaggs as Phil "Smilin' Phil" Fox / Todd Streeb 
 James Tolkan as Dan "Iceberg" Eagan 
 Heidi Schanz as Joyce Alt 
 Cristi Conaway as Julianne 
 Angela Jones as Janette 
 Michael David Simms as Mitch Reed 
 Amy Moon as Ava 
 Marc Baur as Leo

Release
In June 1996 the film premiered at Italy's Mystfest, where it was nominated for Best Film. It was also shown at the Austin Film Festival on October 10, 1996. The film was released in the United States on May 9, 1997.

Reception
CNN reviewer Paul Tatara gave a highly negative review of the film, dubbing it as "...very violent, very profane, and very bad. There's less killing at your local slaughterhouse, and the dialogue is probably sharper." Anita Gates of The New York Times noted that the film with all its flaws was "Fine actors in the lead roles struggle to maintain their dignity and to breathe some believability into these characters, who all talk strangely alike, and to an admirable degree they succeed."

References

External links
 
 
 

1996 films
Mafia comedy films
1990s English-language films
Films directed by Roger Christian
1996 action comedy films
1996 thriller films
American action comedy films
Films scored by Anthony Marinelli
1996 comedy films
1990s American films